La Junta station is a train station in La Junta, Colorado served by Amtrak. Amtrak's Southwest Chief trains 3 & 4 stop here for 10–15 minutes. Westbound trains are scheduled to arrive at 8:15 AM and depart at 8:30 AM, while the eastbound trains arrive at 7:30 PM and depart at 7:41 PM (all times Mountain Time Zone). There are no facilities at the station itself beyond a toilet and beverage vending machine. La Junta was a major point along the Atchison, Topeka and Santa Fe Railway, as a branch line to Pueblo and Denver started from here.

La Junta station was originally built in 1955 as a replacement for the former Harvey House. The freight house, which was part of the previous station was spared from being demolished and now serves as a Purina feed mill.

See also 
List of Amtrak stations

References

External links

La Junta Amtrak Station USA Rail Guide -- TrainWeb)
La Junta Station (Surviving Santa Fe Depots)

Amtrak stations in Colorado
Transportation buildings and structures in Otero County, Colorado
Atchison, Topeka and Santa Fe Railway stations
Railway stations in the United States opened in 1955
1955 establishments in Colorado